Vincent Thill (born 4 February 2000) is a Luxembourgish professional footballer who plays as a midfielder for the Luxembourg national team. He is the younger brother of fellow Luxembourg internationals Sébastien Thill and Olivier Thill.

He was included in The Guardian's "Next Generation 2017".

Club career
Thill started his career with Luxembourgish side Fola Esch before transferring to Progrès Niederkorn, where he spent six months.

He joined Metz in 2012, and signed his first professional contract on 26 May 2016, despite interest from Bayern Munich. On 21 September 2016, Thill made his debut for Metz in a 0–3 defeat against Bordeaux, coming on in the 82nd minute. In doing so, Thill became the first player born in the 2000s to appear in Ligue 1 and in any of Europe's top five leagues.

In August 2018, Thill joined Pau on loan for the 2018–19 season. In the following season, he was loaned out to US Orléans.

On 1 April 2022, Thill joined Örebro in Sweden on a three-months loan.

On 5 August 2022, Thill joined Allsvenskan club AIK on a one-year loan.

International career
Thill became the youngest player to represent the Luxembourg national team when he made his debut on 25 March 2016, in a 3–0 defeat against Bosnia and Herzegovina. Upon scoring a 90th-minute goal against Nigeria in a 3–1 defeat on 31 May 2016, he became his nation's youngest ever goalscorer and the first player born in the new millennium to score an international goal.

Personal life
Vincent is the brother of Sébastien Thill, who plays for Hansa Rostock, and of Olivier Thill, who plays for Eyüpspor. He is also the son of former international footballer Serge Thill.

Career statistics

Club

International

Scores and results list Luxembourg's goal tally first, score column indicates score after each Thill goal.

References

External links 
 Metz profile

2000 births
Living people
Sportspeople from Luxembourg City
Luxembourgian footballers
Association football midfielders
Luxembourg international footballers
Luxembourg youth international footballers
Ligue 1 players
Ligue 2 players
Championnat National players
Primeira Liga players
Allsvenskan players
FC Metz players
Pau FC players
US Orléans players
C.D. Nacional players
FC Vorskla Poltava players
Örebro SK players
AIK Fotboll players
Luxembourgian expatriate footballers
Luxembourgian expatriate sportspeople in France
Expatriate footballers in France
Luxembourgian expatriate sportspeople in Portugal
Expatriate footballers in Portugal
Luxembourgian expatriate sportspeople in Ukraine
Expatriate footballers in Ukraine
Luxembourgian expatriate sportspeople in Sweden
Expatriate footballers in Sweden